Anna Margareta Hartman Sjödin (born April 22, 1976) is a Swedish Social Democratic politician, and elected president of the Social Democratic Youth League from August 3, 2005, to December 16, 2006. She was also elected vice president of the International Union of Socialist Youth (IUSY) at the congress in January 2006. Sjödin is the second woman, after Anna Lindh, to be elected president of the Social Democratic Youth League.

Family life
Anna Sjödin is born in Össeby-Garn in Stockholm County and was raised outside of Enköping. She played rugby union in her youth and represented  four times in 1994. After completing her secondary education Sjödin spent one year working at a health care facility in England and after that some time at a Kibbutz in Israel. After returning to Sweden she joined the Social Democratic Youth League at the age of 19, and moved to Umeå in order to study social work and public administration at Umeå University. After having completed her studies Sjödin worked at a women's shelter.

Political career
Anna Sjödin was first elected chairperson for the Social Democratic Youth League in Västerbotten, and in 2001 was elected in to the board of the Social Democratic Youth League. In August 2005 Sjödin was unanimously elected as the new chairperson of the Social Democratic Youth League after Ardalan Shekarabi who chose not to stand for re-election after several scandals and divisive battles. In December 2006 she had to resign from the chairperson position after found guilty of a number of severe criminal actions while drunk. See below. Later she has taken a position as a headmaster of a Folk high school in Vindeln, North Sweden.

2006 arrest and criminal charges
On January 29, 2006, Sjödin was arrested by the police outside the pub Crazy Horse in Östermalm in Stockholm. According to Babak Jamei, one of the bouncers, a drunk Sjödin not only assaulted him and other bouncers but also used derogatory words--alluding to the fact that he was an immigrant. Sjödin, however, claims that the bouncers assaulted her and her friends. She had to spend the night in the constabulary. The prosecutor rejected Sjödins allegations, but continued investigating the allegations made by the bouncers.

During the trial Sjödin continued to claim that the bouncer had shouted profanities at her and her friend and that he was aggressive, but she also admitted that she had drunk a couple of beers, a third of a bottle of wine and one tequila. The barman had determined that Sjödin was too drunk to be served, and called the bouncers to eject Sjödin and her friend. During the trial, witnesses testified that Sjödin, who is a former rugby union footballer, had used violence in resisting her ejection from the pub.

On October 12, 2006, the Stockholm district court found Sjödin guilty of assaulting the bouncer on charges of slander, criminal conversion, assaulting a person holding legal authority and resisting lawful apprehension. She was sentenced to pay a fine of 120 days wages at 300 kronor per day (36,000 kronor in total). Sjödin was also ordered to pay 5,500 kronor in damages to Babak Jamei, the doorman. The court found that Sjödin had used words of "racist characteristic", she had used a racist slur and had said that people such as him were not welcome in Sweden. The court said that there was strong evidence that Sjödin had challenged the bouncer's authority. The court also found that Sjödin had ripped Jamei's badge from his jacket and taken it with her into a police car. Sjödin has decided to appeal the verdict to the Svea Court of Appeal. The Court of Appeal decided not to try this case (the Court of Appeal can deny cases when the penalty is a fine). She has said she will appeal this denial, since in this case it is not only a fine, but a political career at stake.

References

External links
Swedish Social Democratic Youth League 

1976 births
Living people
People from Vallentuna Municipality
Swedish Social Democratic Party politicians
Umeå University alumni
Swedish female rugby union players
21st-century Swedish women politicians